The following is a list of hospitals in England.  For NHS trusts, see the list of NHS Trusts.

East Midlands
Arnold Lodge, Leicestershire
Babington Hospital – Belper, Derbyshire
Bassetlaw District General Hospital – Worksop, Nottinghamshire 
Berrywood Hospital, Northampton
Buxton Hospital – Buxton, Derbyshire 
Cavendish Hospital – Buxton, Derbyshire
Chesterfield Royal Hospital – Chesterfield
Derbyshire Children's Hospital – Derby
Derbyshire Royal Infirmary, Derby
Florence Nightingale Community Hospital (formerly site of Derbyshire Royal Infirmary) – Derby
Glenfield General Hospital – Glenfield, Leicestershire
Grantham and District Hospital – Grantham, Lincolnshire
Ilkeston Community Hospital – Ilkeston, Derbyshire 
John Coupland Hospital – Gainsborough, Lincolnshire
Kettering General Hospital – Kettering, Northamptonshire
King's Mill Hospital – Sutton-in-Ashfield, Nottinghamshire
Leicester General Hospital – Leicester
Leicester Royal Infirmary – Leicester
Lincoln County Hospital – Lincoln, Lincolnshire
County Hospital Louth – Louth, Lincolnshire
Newark Hospital – Newark-on-Trent, Nottinghamshire 
Newholme Hospital – Bakewell, Derbyshire 
Northampton General Hospital – Northampton, Northamptonshire
Nottingham City Hospital – Nottingham
Nuffield Health Derby Hospital (independent) – Derby
Pilgrim Hospital – Boston, Lincolnshire
Queen's Medical Centre – Nottingham
Rampton Secure Hospital – Nottinghamshire
Ripley Hospital  – Ripley, Derbyshire
Royal Derby Hospital (formerly Derby City General Hospital) – Derby
St Andrew's Hospital (independent) – Northampton
St Mary's Hospital – Kettering
St Oswald's Hospital – Ashbourne, Derbyshire 
Whitworth Hospital – Matlock, Derbyshire

East of England
Addenbrooke's Hospital – Cambridge
Aldeburgh Cottage Hospital – Suffolk
Basildon University Hospital – Basildon, Essex
Bedford Hospital – Bedford
Braintree Community Hospital, Essex
Broomfield Hospital – Chelmsford
Colchester Hospital – Colchester, Essex
Cromer Hospital – Cromer, Norfolk
Fulbourn Hospital, Cambridgeshire
Hellesdon Hospital – Norwich, Norfolk
Hemel Hempstead Hospital – Hemel Hempstead, Hertfordshire
Herts and Essex Hospital – Bishop's Stortford, Hertfordshire – community hospital
Hertford County Hospital, Hertfordshire
Hinchingbrooke Hospital – Huntingdon, Cambridgeshire
Ipswich Hospital – Ipswich
James Paget University Hospital – Gorleston, Great Yarmouth, Norfolk
Kingsley Green, Hertfordshire
Lister Hospital – Stevenage, Hertfordshire
Luton and Dunstable University Hospital – Luton, Bedfordshire
Norfolk and Norwich University Hospital – Norwich
North Cambridgeshire Hospital – Wisbech
Northgate Hospital, Norfolk
Norwich Community Hospital – Norwich
Nuffield Health Cambridge Hospital (independent) – Cambridge
Peterborough City Hospital – Peterborough, Cambridgeshire
Princess Alexandra Hospital, Harlow – Harlow, Essex
Princess of Wales Hospital – Ely, Cambridgeshire
Queen Elizabeth Hospital – King's Lynn, Norfolk
New QEII Hospital – Welwyn Garden City, Hertfordshire
Rivers Hospital – Sawbridgeworth, Hertfordshire
 The Rosie Hospital – Cambridge
Royal Papworth Hospital – Cambridgeshire
St Albans City Hospital – St Albans, Hertfordshire
St Andrew's Healthcare – Essex, Basildon, Essex
St Margaret's Hospital, Epping – Epping, Essex
St Peter's Hospital, Maldon, Essex
Stamford and Rutland Hospital – Stamford, Lincolnshire
Southend University Hospital – Westcliff-on-Sea, Essex
West Suffolk Hospital – Bury St Edmunds, Suffolk
Watford General Hospital – Watford Hertfordshire
Violet Hill Hospital – Stowmarket, Suffolk

London

North central
Barnet Hospital – Barnet
Eastman Dental Hospital
Nightingale Hospital – Marylebone (independent)
Chase Farm Hospital – Enfield
Coppetts Wood Hospital – Muswell Hill
Gordon Hospital – Pimlico
Great Ormond Street Hospital – Bloomsbury
Hospital for Tropical Diseases
London Lock Hospital
St Lukes Hospital – Muswell Hill
Hospital of St John and St Elizabeth – St John's Wood (independent)
Middlesex Hospital
North Middlesex University Hospital – Edmonton
The Priory Hospital – Southgate (independent)
Royal Free Hospital – Hampstead
Royal London Hospital for Integrated Medicine
St Ann's Hospital – Harringay
St Pancras Hospital – St Pancras, London
University College Hospital – Bloomsbury
Wellington Hospital – St John's Wood (independent)
Whittington Hospital – Highgate

North east
Claybury Hospital
Goodmayes Hospital
Harold Wood Hospital
Homerton University Hospital – Homerton, London
St Leonard's Hospital – Hackney, London
King George Hospital – Redbridge
Mile End Hospital – Tower Hamlets, Whitechapel
Moorfields Eye Hospital – London Borough of Islington
National Hospital for Neurology and Neurosurgery – Bloomsbury, London
Newham University Hospital – Plaistow
Oldchurch Hospital
Queen Elizabeth Hospital for Children
Queen's Hospital – Romford
Royal London Hospital – Tower Hamlets, Whitechapel
Royal National Throat, Nose and Ear Hospital – Gray's Inn Road, Camden
Rush Green Hospital
St Bartholomew's Hospital, Smithfield, London
St George's Hospital – Havering
Thorpe Coombe Hospital – Walthamstow
Whipps Cross University Hospital – Leytonstone

North west
Hammersmith Hospital – Hammersmith & Fulham
Central Middlesex Hospital – Park Royal
Ealing Hospital – Southall, Ealing
Finchley Memorial Hospital
Friern Hospital
Fulham Hospital
Harefield Hospital – Harefield
Hillingdon Hospital – Uxbridge, Hillingdon
Metropolitan Free Hospital
Mount Vernon Hospital – Hillingdon
Northwick Park Hospital – Brent
Queen Charlotte's and Chelsea Hospital – Hammersmith & Fulham
Royal National Orthopaedic Hospital – Stanmore
St Bernard's Hospital – Southall
St Mark's Hospital
St Mary's Hospital – Paddington
Western Eye Hospital – Marylebone

South east
Beckenham Beacon – Beckenham
Bethlem Royal Hospital – Beckenham
Bexley Hospital, Bexleyheath
Bromley Hospital
Croydon University Hospital – Thornton Heath
Dulwich Community Hospital
Erith and District Hospital
Evelina London Children's Hospital – Lambeth
General Lying-In Hospital
Greenwich District Hospital
Guy's Hospital – Southwark
King's College Hospital – Camberwell
Lambeth Hospital – Stockwell
London Bridge Hospital – London (independent)
Maudsley Hospital – Camberwell
Memorial Hospital, Woolwich – Woolwich
Miller General Hospital
Orpington Hospital – Orpington
Princess Royal University Hospital – Farnborough
Priory Hospital – Hayes Grove, Bromley (independent)
Queen Elizabeth Hospital – Woolwich
Queen Mary's Hospital – Sidcup
St Alfege's Hospital
St Thomas' Hospital – Lambeth
University Hospital Lewisham – Lewisham

South west
Atkinson Morley Hospital, Wimbledon
Banstead Hospital, Sutton
Barnes Hospital, London
Cassel Hospital
Charing Cross Hospital – Hammersmith
Chelsea and Westminster Hospital – Chelsea
Cromwell Hospital – South Kensington (independent)
King Edward VII's Hospital – Westminster
Kingston Hospital – Kingston upon Thames
Lister Hospital – Chelsea (independent)
The London Clinic – Westminster (independent)
Portland Hospital – Marylebone/Fitzrovia (independent)
The Princess Grace Hospital – Marylebone (independent)
Priory Hospital, Roehampton – Roehampton (independent)
Queen Mary's Hospital – Roehampton
Richmond Royal Hospital – Richmond
Royal Brompton Hospital – Chelsea
Royal Hospital Chelsea – Chelsea
Royal Hospital for Neuro-disability – Putney
Royal Marsden Hospital – Chelsea
Royal Marsden Hospital – Belmont
St Charles' Hospital – Royal Borough of Kensington and Chelsea
Springfield University Hospital – Tooting
St Anthony's Hospital – Cheam (independent)
St George's Hospital – Tooting
St Helier Hospital – Sutton
St James' Hospital, Balham
Teddington Memorial Hospital – Teddington
Tolworth Hospital – Tolworth
University College Hospital at Westmoreland Street – Marylebone
West Middlesex University Hospital – Isleworth
Wilson Hospital – Mitcham

North East

County Durham
Auckland Park Hospital – Bishop Auckland
Bishop Auckland Hospital – Bishop Auckland
Chester-le-Street Hospital – Chester-le-Street
County Hospital – Durham
Darlington Memorial Hospital – Darlington
Lanchester Road Hospital – Durham
Nuffield Health Tees Hospital (independent) – Stockton-on-Tees
Priory Hospital, Middleton St George – Middleton St George
Peterlee Community Hospital – Peterlee
Shotley Bridge Hospital – Shotley Bridge
University Hospital of Hartlepool – Hartlepool
University Hospital of North Durham – Durham
University Hospital of North Tees – Stockton-on-Tees
West Park Hospital – Darlington

Northumberland
Alnwick Infirmary – Alnwick
Berwick Infirmary – Berwick-upon-Tweed
Blyth Community Hospital – Blyth
Haltwhistle War Memorial Hospital – Haltwhistle
Hexham General Hospital – Hexham
Northumbria Specialist Emergency Care Hospital – Cramlington
Rothbury Community Hospital – Rothbury
St George's Park, Morpeth
Wansbeck General Hospital – Ashington

North Yorkshire (part)
The James Cook University Hospital – Middlesbrough
Roseberry Park Hospital – Middlesbrough

Tyne and Wear
Great North Children's Hospital, Newcastle
Sunderland Eye Infirmary - Sunderland
Freeman Hospital – Newcastle upon Tyne
Newcastle General Hospital – Newcastle upon Tyne
Monkwearmouth Hospital - Sunderland
North Tyneside General Hospital – North Shields
Nuffield Health Newcastle-upon-Tyne Hospital (independent) – Newcastle upon Tyne
Queen Elizabeth Hospital – Gateshead
Royal Victoria Infirmary – Newcastle upon Tyne
Sanderson Hospital, Newcastle
St Nicholas Hospital – Gosforth
Sir G B Hunter Memorial Hospital – Wallsend
South Tyneside District Hospital – South Shields
Sunderland Royal Hospital – Sunderland

North West
Aintree University Hospital – Liverpool
Arrowe Park Hospital – Wirral
Ashworth Hospital
Alder Hey Children's Hospital – Liverpool
Alexandra Hospital – Cheadle, Greater Manchester
Atherleigh Park Hospital - Leigh, Greater Manchester
Altrincham Hospital – Altrincham
Barnes Hospital – Cheadle
Billinge Hospital – Wigan
Blackpool Victoria Hospital – Blackpool, Lancashire
Broadgreen Hospital – Liverpool
Burnley General Teaching Hospital – Burnley, Lancashire
Calderstones Hospital, Lancashire
Cheadle Royal Hospital
Christie Hospital, Manchester
Clatterbridge Cancer Centre
Clatterbridge Hospital – Wirral
Chorley and South Ribble Hospital – Chorley
Countess of Chester Hospital – Chester, Cheshire
Cumberland Infirmary – Carlisle
Fairfield General Hospital – Bury
Furness General Hospital – Barrow-in-Furness
Halton General Hospital – Runcorn
Leigh Infirmary – Leigh
Leighton Hospital – Crewe
Liverpool Heart and Chest Hospital – Liverpool
Liverpool Women's Hospital – Liverpool
Lytham Hospital – Lytham
Macclesfield District General Hospital – Macclesfield
Manchester Royal Eye Hospital – Manchester
Manchester Royal Infirmary – Manchester
Spire Cheshire Hospital (independent) – Warrington
North Manchester General Hospital
Ormskirk District General Hospital
Pendle Community Hospital, Lancashire
Prestwich Hospital – Bury, Greater Manchester
Queen Victoria Hospital – Morecambe
Rochdale Infirmary
Royal Albert Edward Infirmary – Wigan
Royal Blackburn Teaching Hospital – Blackburn
Royal Bolton Hospital – Farnworth, near Bolton
Royal Lancaster Infirmary – Lancaster
Royal Liverpool University Hospital – Liverpool
Royal Manchester Children's Hospital
Royal Oldham Hospital – Oldham
Royal Preston Hospital – Preston
Salford Royal Hospital – Salford
Southport and Formby District General Hospital, Kew, Southport
St Catherine's Health Centre, Merseyside
St Helens Hospital – Merseyside
Saint Mary's Hospital, Manchester – Manchester
Stepping Hill Hospital – Stockport
Tameside General Hospital – Ashton-under-Lyne
Trafford General Hospital – Davyhulme, Manchester – formally Park Hospital
The Harbour - Blackpool
University Dental Hospital of Manchester
Victoria Infirmary, Cheshire
The Walton Centre for Neurology and Neurosurgery – Liverpool
Warrington Hospital – Warrington
West Cumberland Hospital – Whitehaven
Westmorland General Hospital – Kendal
Whiston Hospital – Merseyside
Wirral Women and Children's Hospital
Withington Hospital – Manchester
Wrightington Hospital – Wrightington
Wythenshawe Hospital – Manchester

South East
Arundel and District Hospital, West Sussex
Ashford Hospital – Ashford, Surrey
Bexhill Hospital – Bexhill-on-Sea, East Sussex
Bexley Hospital, Kent
Bognor Regis War Memorial Hospital, West Sussex
Brighton General Hospital – Brighton
Buckland Hospital – Dover
Conquest Hospital – Hastings, East Sussex
Crawley Hospital – Crawley, West Sussex
Darent Valley Hospital – Dartford, Kent
Eastbourne District General Hospital – Eastbourne, East Sussex
East Surrey Hospital – Redhill, Surrey
Epsom Cottage Hospital, Surrey
Epsom Hospital – Epsom
Farnham Hospital, Surrey
Farnham Road Hospital, Surrey
Frimley Park Hospital – Frimley, Surrey
The Horder Centre – Crowborough, East Sussex
Horsham Hospital – Horsham, West Sussex
Kent and Canterbury Hospital – Canterbury, Kent
KIMS Hospital – Maidstone, Kent
Lewes Victoria Hospital – Lewes, East Sussex
The McIndoe Centre – East Grinstead, Kent
Maidstone Hospital – Maidstone, Kent
Medway Maritime Hospital – Medway, Kent
Milford Hospital, Surrey
The Montefiore Hospital – Hove, East Sussex
Nuffield Health Brighton Hospital (independent) – Brighton
Nuffield Health Woking Hospital - Woking
Princess Royal Hospital – Haywards Heath, West Sussex
Queen Elizabeth The Queen Mother Hospital – Margate, Kent
Queen Victoria Hospital – East Grinstead, West Sussex
Royal Sussex County Hospital – Brighton
Royal Alexandra Children's Hospital – Brighton
Royal Surrey County Hospital – Guildford, Surrey
Royal Victoria Hospital – Folkestone, Kent
Southlands Hospital – Shoreham-by-Sea, West Sussex
Spire Alexandra Hospital (independent) – Chatham, Kent
Spire Clare Park Hospital (independent) – Farnham, Surrey
Spire Gatwick Park Hospital (independent) – Horley, Surrey
Spire Sussex Hospital (independent) – St Leonards-on-sea, East Sussex
Spire Tunbridge Wells (independent) – Tunbridge Wells, Kent
St Ebba's Hospital, Surrey
St Martin's Hospital, Canterbury, Kent
St Peter's Hospital – Chertsey, Surrey
St Richard's Hospital – Chichester, West Sussex
Tunbridge Wells Hospital
William Harvey Hospital – Ashford, Kent
Worthing Hospital – Worthing, West Sussex
Zachary Merton Hospital

South Central
Amersham Hospital – Amersham, Buckinghamshire
Andover War Memorial Hospital – Andover, Hampshire
Basingstoke and North Hampshire Hospital - Basingstoke, Hampshire
Broadmoor Hospital –  Crowthorne, Berkshire
Churchill Hospital – Oxford
Fareham Community Hospital – Locksheath, Fareham, Southampton
Fordingbridge Hospital – Fordingbridge, Hants
Gosport War Memorial Hospital – Gosport, Hampshire
Heatherwood Hospital – Ascot, Berkshire
Horton General Hospital – Banbury, Oxfordshire
John Radcliffe Hospital – Oxford
Lymington New Forest Hospital – Lymington
Moorgreen Hospital – West End, Hampshire
Milton Keynes University Hospital – Milton Keynes
Netley Hospital – Netley, Hampshire
New Hall Hospital (independent) – Salisbury 
Nuffield Orthopaedic Centre (independent) – Oxford
Nuffield Health Wessex Hospital (independent) – Chandler's Ford
Oxford Clinic for Specialist Surgery (independent) – Oxford
Petersfield Hospital – Petersfield, Hampshire
Princess Anne Hospital – Southampton
Queen Alexandra Hospital – Portsmouth, Hampshire
Romsey Community Hospital – Romsey
Royal Berkshire Hospital – Reading, Berkshire
Royal Buckinghamshire Hospital – Aylesbury, Buckinghamshire
Royal Hampshire County Hospital – Winchester
Royal South Hants Hospital – Southampton. Hampshire
Roundway Hospital – Devizes, Wiltshire
Southampton General Hospital – Southampton
Spire Portsmouth Hospital (independent) – Havant, Hampshire
Spire Southampton Hospital (independent) – Southampton, Hampshire
Stoke Mandeville Hospital – Aylesbury, Buckinghamshire
St James' Hospital – Portsmouth, Hampshire
St Mary's Hospital – Isle of Wight
St Mary's Hospital – Portsmouth, Hampshire
Tatchbury Mount Hospital – Totton
Warneford Hospital – Oxford
West Berkshire Community Hospital – Thatcham
Western Community Hospital – Southampton
Wexham Park Hospital – Wexham, Slough, Berkshire
Wycombe Hospital – High Wycombe, Buckinghamshire

South West
Alderney Hospital – Poole
Blackberry Hill Hospital, Bristol
Bodmin Hospital – Bodmin, Cornwall
BMI The Winterbourne Hospital (Independent) – Dorchester, Dorset
Bristol Eye Hospital – Bristol
Bristol Royal Hospital for Children – Bristol
Bristol Royal Infirmary – Bristol
Brookland Hall, Bristol
Callington Road Hospital, Bristol
Camborne Redruth Community Hospital – Illogan Highway
Cheltenham General Hospital – Cheltenham, Gloucestershire
Cheltenham Nuffield Hospital (independent) - Cheltenham, Gloucestershire
Christchurch Hospital – Christchurch, Dorset
Cossham Memorial Hospital – Bristol
Derriford Hospital – Plymouth
Duchy Hospital, Truro (independent) – Cornwall
Dorset County Hospital – Dorchester
Edward Hain Hospital – St Ives
Fountain Way – Salisbury, Wiltshire
Frenchay Hospital, Gloucestershire
Gloucestershire Royal Hospital – Gloucester
Great Western Hospital – Swindon
Green Lane Hospital – Devizes
Helston Community Hospital – Helston, Cornwall
Musgrove Park Hospital – Taunton, Somerset
Newton Abbot Community Hospital – Newton Abbot, Devon
North Devon District Hospital – Barnstaple, Devon
North Somerset Community Hospital, Clevedon, North Somerset
Paulton Memorial Hospital – Paulton, Somerset
Petherton Resource Centre, Bristol
Poole Hospital – Poole, Dorset
Royal Bournemouth Hospital – Bournemouth, Dorset
Royal Cornwall Hospital – Truro
Royal Devon and Exeter Hospital – Exeter
Royal National Hospital for Rheumatic Diseases – Bath, Somerset
Royal United Hospital – Bath
Royal Victoria Hospital – Bournemouth, Dorset
South Bristol Community Hospital – Bristol
St Ann's Hospital – Poole, Dorset
St Austell Community Hospital – St Austell, Cornwall
St Leonard's Hospital – Ferndown, Dorset
St Michael's Hospital – Bristol
St Michael's Hospital – Hayle, Cornwall
Salisbury District Hospital – Salisbury, Wiltshire
South Hams Hospital – Kingsbridge
Southmead Hospital – Bristol
Stroud General Hospital – Stroud
Tiverton and District Hospital - Tiverton, Devon
Torbay Hospital – Torquay
Totnes Community Hospital – Totnes
University of Bristol Dental Hospital – Bristol
Vale Community Hospital – Dursley, Gloucestershire 
 Wellesley Hospital – Wellington, Somerset 
Weston General Hospital – Weston-super-Mare
West Cornwall Hospital – Penzance
Westminster Memorial Hospital – Shaftesbury, Dorset
Yeovil District Hospital – Yeovil, Somerset

West Midlands
Alexandra Hospital – Redditch
Birmingham Children's Hospital – Birmingham
Birmingham Dental Hospital – Birmingham
Birmingham Nuffield Hospital (independent) – Edgbaston, Birmingham
Birmingham Women's Hospital – Edgbaston, Birmingham
Bushey Fields Hospital, Dudley
BMI The Meriden Hospital – Coventry
Cannock Chase Hospital – Cannock
City Hospital, Birmingham – Birmingham
The (BMI) Edgbaston Hospital (independent) – Birmingham
Corbett Hospital, Dudley
Ellen Badger Hospital – Shipston-on-Stour
George Eliot Hospital – Nuneaton
Good Hope Hospital – Sutton Coldfield, Birmingham
Guest Hospital, Dudley
Harplands Hospital – Stoke-on-Trent
Heartlands Hospital – Birmingham
Hereford County Hospital – Hereford
Kidderminster Hospital – Kidderminster
Leamington Spa Hospital – Leamington Spa
Ludlow Hospital, Shropshire
Midland Metropolitan University Hospital
Moseley Hall Hospital – Moseley, Birmingham
New Cross Hospital – Wolverhampton
Nuffield Health Warwickshire Hospital (independent) – Leamington Spa
Nuffield Health Shrewsbury Hospital (independent) – Shrewsbury
Princess Royal Hospital – Telford
 The (BMI) Priory Hospital (independent) – Birmingham
Queen Elizabeth Hospital Birmingham – Birmingham
Queen's Hospital – Burton upon Trent
Robert Jones and Agnes Hunt Orthopaedic Hospital – Oswestry
Rowley Regis Hospital
Royal Orthopaedic Hospital – Northfield, Birmingham
Royal Shrewsbury Hospital – Shrewsbury
Royal Stoke University Hospital – Stoke-on-Trent
Russells Hall Hospital – Dudley
Sandwell General Hospital – Sandwell
Selly Oak Hospital – Birmingham
Spire Parkway Hospital (independent) – Solihull
Hospital of St. Cross, Rugby – Warwickshire
St Michael's Hospital, Warwick – Warwickshire
Solihull Hospital – Solihull
County Hospital – Stafford
Stratford Hospital – Stratford-upon-Avon
University Hospital Coventry – Coventry
Walsall Manor Hospital – Walsall
Warwick Hospital – Warwick
West Heath Hospital – Birmingham
The Woodbourne Priory (independent) – Birmingham
Worcestershire Royal Hospital – Worcester
Tenbury Community Hospital – Tenbury Wells

Yorkshire and the Humber

East Riding of Yorkshire
Alfred Bean Hospital – Driffield
Bridlington Hospital – Bridlington
Castle Hill Hospital – Cottingham
East Riding Community Hospital – Beverley
Goole and District Hospital – Goole
Hornsea Cottage Hospital – Hornsea
Hull and East Riding Hospital – Anlaby
Hull Royal Infirmary – Hull
Withernsea Community Hospital – Withernsea

Lincolnshire (part)
Diana, Princess of Wales Hospital – Grimsby, North East Lincolnshire
St Hugh's Hospital – Grimsby, North East Lincolnshire 
Scunthorpe General Hospital – Scunthorpe, North Lincolnshire

North Yorkshire (part)
BMI The Duchy Hospital, Harrogate
Friarage Hospital – Northallerton
Friary Community Hospital – Richmond
Harrogate District Hospital – Harrogate
Malton Community Hospital – Malton
The Retreat – York
Ripon Community Hospital – Ripon
Scarborough Hospital – Scarborough
Skipton General Hospital – Skipton
Whitby Hospital – Whitby
York Hospital – York

South Yorkshire
 Barnsley Hospital – Barnsley
 Charles Clifford Dental Hospital – Sheffield
 Claremont Hospital (independent) – Sheffield
 Doncaster Royal Infirmary – Doncaster
 Kendray Hospital – Barnsley
 Montagu Hospital – Mexborough
 Northern General Hospital – Sheffield
 Park Hill Hospital (independent) – Doncaster
 Rotherham General Hospital – Rotherham
 Royal Hallamshire Hospital – Sheffield
 Sheffield Children's Hospital – Sheffield
 Thornbury Hospital (independent) – Sheffield
 Tickhill Road Hospital, Doncaster
 Weston Park Hospital – Sheffield

West Yorkshire
Airedale General Hospital – Keighley
Bradford Royal Infirmary – Bradford
Calderdale Royal Hospital – Halifax
Chapel Allerton Hospital – Leeds
Dewsbury and District Hospital – Dewsbury
Fieldhead Hospital – Wakefield
Leeds Dental Institute – Leeds
Leeds General Infirmary – Leeds
Lynfield Mount Hospital – Bradford
Huddersfield Royal Infirmary – Huddersfield
Spire Methley Park Hospital (independent) – Methley
Nuffield Health Leeds Hospital (independent) – Leeds
Pinderfields Hospital – Wakefield
Pontefract Hospital – Pontefract
St James's University Hospital – Leeds
St Luke's Hospital, Bradford – Bradford
Seacroft Hospital – Leeds
Wharfedale Hospital – Otley

References

External links
 

 List
 List
Hospitals
England